Meléndez is a common surname in the Spanish language. The variant is Melendez. It may refer to:

 Adolfo Meléndez
 Gerardo Meléndez, Puerto Rico-born scientist
 Jorge Meléndez
 Carlos Meléndez (disambiguation), multiple people
 Juan Meléndez Valdés, Spanish poet
 Rodrigo Meléndez, Chilean football player

See also
 Melendez

Spanish-language surnames